The Mongalla Game Reserve is found in South Sudan. It was established in 1939. This site covers 75 km.

References

Protected areas of South Sudan
Protected areas established in 1939
1939 establishments in Sudan